Magín Catalá y Guasch (Catalan: Magí Català i Guasch; born Montblanc, 1761 – died Santa Clara, California, 1830) was a Spanish missionary of the Franciscan Order in California.

Biography
Magín Catalá was born as Magí Català i Guasch on January 30, 1761, together with another twin brother, in Montblanc, Tarragona diocese, Spain. He was the son of the spouses Matais (Macià) Català i Roig and Francesca Guasch i Burgueras. At the age of sixteen, both of the twin brothers entered the Observant Franciscan order (Order of the Friars Minor) on April 4, 1777, in Barcelona. He studied philosophy, theology and morals in Girona and was ordained a priest in 1785.

Shortly after, he went to Cádiz, where he sailed in October of 1786 to America with Father Josep de la Creu Espi, O.F.M. He arrived in Mexico City in 1786 and joined the Missionary School of San Fernando. It was spent a few years until it was destined to missions on the west coast of the current countries of the United States and Canada, to accompany travelers on the Nootka Bay route, acting as the priest of the Aranzazu frigate.

In 1793 he was sent to Monterrey, and, shortly after that, he was sent to the Mission of Santa Clara on the Pacific coast. Seldom came out of Santa Clara and his evangelizing and humanitarian work was extraordinary among the American Indians. He died on November 22, 1830, and was buried in the Mission Santa Clara church. He became renowned for his miracles and prophecies. The figure of a crucifix in Mission Santa Clara de Asís is said to have leaned forward to commend him when preaching. The cause of his beatification was introduced in 1884.

Veneration
In 1884 the archbishop of San Francisco, the Catalan Dominican José Sadoc Alemany, instructed the canonical process of beatification of Fra Magín, in which they declared 62 witnesses. In 1908, the Vatican Court ordered the instruction of the "non-cult" process, as well as the collection of writings of Catalá.

His memory is kept at Montblanc, Tarragona in Spain, which has a street dedicated to his name, and the house where he was born is a missionary plate marble memorial.

See also
Juan Bautista Sancho
José Francisco Ortega

References

1761 births
1830 deaths
Roman Catholic missionaries in Mexico
People from Conca de Barberà
Spanish Franciscans
Spanish Servants of God
Spanish Roman Catholic missionaries
Spanish expatriates in Mexico